The Stearman XBT-17 was a prototype 1940s American two-seat low-wing monoplane primary trainer designed and built by Stearman Aircraft (as the Model X-90). It was evaluated by the United States Army Air Force in 1942 as the XBT-17.

Design and development
The X-90 was a low-wing cantilever monoplane with two-seats in tandem under an enclosed canopy. It had a fixed conventional landing gear and was powered by a  Lycoming R-680 engine and first flew in 1940. It had wooden wings and a steel tube forward fuselage in order minimize use of aluminum. In 1942 the aircraft was re-engined with a  Pratt & Whitney R-985 engine and redesignated the Model X-91. The X-91 was evaluated by the United States Army Air Force as the XBT-17 but no more were built.

Variants
Stearman X-90
Prototype basic trainer with a  Lycoming R-680 engine.
Stearman X-91
The X-90 re-engined with a  Pratt & Whitney R-985 engine for USAAF evaluation.
Stearman XBT-17
United States Army Air Force designation for the X-91.

Specifications (XBT-17)

See also

References

Notes

Bibliography

 
 

BT-17
1940s United States military trainer aircraft
Single-engined tractor aircraft
Low-wing aircraft
Aircraft first flown in 1940